Diane Van Deren (born February 20, 1960) is an American ultra-runner who won the Yukon Arctic Ultra 300 in 2009. Van Deren had a lobectomy in 1997. She competed in races of attrition measuring 100 miles or more. She was the first woman to complete the 430-mile Yukon Arctic Ultra 300.

A former professional tennis player, she took up running to help stave off epileptic seizures, for which in 1997 she had a lobectomy. This surgery disrupted her ability to judge the passing of time, something which has helped her ultra-running. She was featured in the 2012 CBC documentary The Perfect Runner, directed by documentary filmmaker Niobe Thompson for The Nature of Things.

References

American female ultramarathon runners
Living people
Place of birth missing (living people)
1960 births
21st-century American women